Marie Popelin (16 December 1846 – 5 June 1913) was a Belgian lawyer and early feminist political campaigner. Popelin worked with Isabelle Gatti de Gamond in the development of women's education and, in 1888, became the first Belgian woman to receive a doctorate in law. After her accession to the bar was refused, Popelin went on to have an active career as the leader of the Belgian League for Women's Rights. She died in 1913 without ever gaining admission to the bar.

Biography 
Marie Popelin was born in Schaerbeek near Brussels into a middle-class family on 16 September 1846. One of her brothers was a doctor, another an army officer—Marie Popelin was well educated by the standards of the time and place. Along with her sister Louise, she taught in Brussels at an institution run by the leading feminist teacher Isabelle Gatti de Gamond from 1864 to 1875. Disagreements with Gatti led to the sisters moving to Mons to run a new school for girls there, established with Liberal assistance. In 1882, Marie Popelin returned to Brussels to head the middle school in nearby Laeken, but was removed from her post the following year.

The "Popelin Affair" 
At the age of 37, Popelin enrolled at the Free University of Brussels, studying law. Completing her studies as a Doctor of Laws in 1888, Popelin was the first woman to do so in Belgium. She applied for admission to the bar association (barreau) which would allow her to plead cases in the Belgian courts. Her application was refused, although no law or regulation explicitly prevented the admission of women to the bar. Her appeals to the court of appeal in December 1888 and, in November 1889, to the Court of Cassation were unsuccessful, but widely reported in the Belgian and foreign press. The "Popelin affair" (Affaire Popelin) demonstrated to the supporters of female education that simply providing young women with access to higher education was insufficient unless further, legal, changes were also made. The affair contributed to the transition from an educational feminism to a political women's movement in Belgium. Jeanne Chauvin, who obtained a law degree in Paris in 1890, was at first discouraged by the case, but was persuaded by the Belgian lawyer Louis Frank, who represented Popelin before the court, to apply for admission to the bar, and was sworn in after the French law was changed in 1900. In Belgium, women were only permitted to practice as lawyers from 1922.

Political activities 
Marie Popelin participated in two feminist conferences in Paris in 1889, and established the Belgian League for the Rights of Women (Ligue belge du droit des femmes) in 1892 with the assistance of Isala Van Diest and Léonie La Fontaine. Popelin was a friend of American feminist May Wright Sewall, who she had met in Paris in 1889, and with Sewall's encouragement, the Belgian section of the International Council of Women was established from 1893. Popelin's efforts to create an independent feminist movement outside the political pillars, not linked to the Catholic, Liberal, or Socialist parties, were only a partial success. The National Council of Belgian Women (Conseil national des femmes belges), created in 1905, received only limited support from the women's sections of the political parties.

In spite of this tepid initial reception, many of Popelin objectives were met before her death in 1913. These legislative reforms did not, however, include two of Popelin's most important demands: universal adult suffrage, and equal access to the liberal professions for women.  acknowledge Marie Popelin's central role in the creation of a Belgian feminist movement.

Commemoration 
Popelin has been commemorated in numerous ways within Belgium. She featured on a Belgian postage stamp during the International Women's Year of 1975, and a road in Saint-Josse-ten-Noode was named after her in 2008. In 2011, Popelin, together with the first Belgian female doctor, Van Diest, were depicted on the Belgian two euro commemorative coin for the 1st centenary of the International Woman's Day. In De Grootste Belg, a 2005 Flemish television poll to find the greatest Belgian of all time, Marie Popelin was ranked 42nd.

On 16 December 2020, Google celebrated her 174th birthday with a Google Doodle.

See also 

 List of first women lawyers and judges in Europe
 List of women's rights activists
 Timeline of women's rights (other than voting)
 Timeline of women's suffrage

Citations

References

Further reading 

 
 
 
 

1846 births
1913 deaths
People from Schaerbeek
Belgian feminists
Belgian educators
Belgian women's rights activists
Free University of Brussels (1834–1969) alumni
Belgian women lawyers
19th-century Belgian lawyers
19th-century Belgian educators
19th-century women lawyers
Belgian suffragists